This is an incomplete list of islands of Texas. Most of Texas' islands are small, unnamed and uninhabited and could not be listed.

 Alcatraz
 Alexander Island
 Atkinson Island (Chambers County)
 Bayucos Island
Bird Island (Chambers County)  
 Blackberry Island
 Brazos Island
 Buckeye Island (Chambers County)
 Clark Island
 Clear Lake Shores (Galveston County)
 Cove Island (Chambers County)
 Coulter Island (Chambers County)
 Coyote Island
 Dagger Island
 Dewberry Island
 Galveston Island
 Goat Island (Galveston County)
 Goat Island (Tarrant County)
 Grass Island
 Hannah Island
 Horse Island (Chambers County)   
 Ingleside Point
 Lawrence Island''' (Chambers County)Leat Island'' (Chambers County)
 Long Island (Calhoun County)
 Long Island (Cameron County)
 Matagorda Island
 Mud Island (Aransas County)
 Mud Island (Brazoria County)
 Mustang Island  
 North Deer Island
 North Padre Island
 Padre Island
 Pelican Island (Corpus Christi)
 Pelican Island (Galveston, Texas)
 Pelone Island
 Pine Island
 Pleasure Island
 Port Aransas 
 Red Fish Island
 San José Island
 Shamrock Island
 Skimmer Key
 South Padre Island
 Spoil Banks
 Tres Marais Island
 Turkey Island
 Turnstake Island
 Twin Island
 Ultimo Island
 Vanderveer Island
 Vingt-et-un Islands
 Walton Island
 Ward Island
 Watts Island
 Wood Island
 Yucca Island

References

Texas
Islands